Brightlingsea is a coastal town and an electoral ward in the Tendring district of Essex, England. It is situated between Colchester and Clacton-on-Sea, at the mouth of the River Colne, on Brightlingsea Creek. At the 2011 Census, it had a population of 8,076. The town is an active though small port.

Its traditional industries included fishery (with a renowned oyster fishery) and shipbuilding. With the decline of these industries, the town is largely a dormitory town for Colchester.

Brightlingsea is a limb of Sandwich, one of the Cinque Ports. The town retains an active ceremonial connection with the Cinque Ports, electing a Deputy from a guild of Freemen.

Brightlingsea was for many years twinned with French oyster fishery port Marennes, Charente-Maritime, but the relationship fell into disuse. In the mid-1990s, the port of Brightlingsea was used for the export of live animals for slaughter, leading to a protest campaign dubbed The Battle of Brightlingsea.

History

Earliest remains
Brightlingsea sits on a promontory surrounded by the River Colne and its associated marshes and creeks (it was an island until the 16th century), and was settled from an early date. In 1995, an Early Neolithic pot, dated 4,000 to 3,100 BC, was found in a D-shaped enclosure with a ditch on a farm near Brightlingsea. Other early remains in the area date from the Bronze Age, Roman and Saxon periods.

The Middle Ages
In the Domesday Book of 1087, the population of Brightlingsea (or Brictesceseia) was given as 24 villagers, 26 smallholders and 5 slaves. The Lord of the manor had been King Harold Godwinson, but the title had passed to King William I. The medieval town grew up around two centres, firstly around the parish church and secondly close to the shore where a port had developed. Trade was in oysters, fish, copperas (a locally found green pigment of iron(II) sulfate) and locally made bricks.

The Cinque Port Liberty
The Cinque Ports were a confederation of the five most important ports on the coast of the English Channel. They had obligations to provide ships and men to fight for the king in times of war but were compensated by lucrative exemptions from taxation. All of the Cinque Ports acquired Limbs or subsidiary ports that would ease the burden of their wartime obligations and share the benefits of their privileges. Brightlingsea became a Limb of the Head Port of Sandwich, and is the only community outside Kent and Sussex that has any connection with the Confederation of the Cinque Ports. Although these days it is a purely ceremonial affair, every year at the parish church, on the first Monday after Saint Andrew's Day (the first in December), known as  Choosing Day, the Freemen of Brightlingsea gather to elect the Deputy of Brightlingsea who is the representative of the Mayor of Sandwich in the Liberty.

The Wars Against France (1793-1815)
During the wars against Revolutionary and Napoleonic France Brightlingsea was a base for the men and boats of the Essex Sea Fencibles (1798-1810), though in 1809 they disgraced themselves by pirating oysters from the River Crouch. During the 1803-1804 invasion scare, a naval gun brig and small gunboat were based in Brightlingsea Creek. Between 1804–1808 Warren's Shipyard built 11 gun brigs for the Navy, and in 1809 the first East Coast Martello Tower was completed on  The Stone opposite Brightlingsea at Point Clear which now hosts East Essex Aviation Museum.

The Church of New Jerusalem
Brightlingsea was one of the first places outside the major towns to have a chapel for the doctrines of the Swedish religious mystic Emmanuel Swedenborg. Its New Church community dates from 1808. Its first chapel was built in 1814 in what is now New Street and is now a private house. Its second dates from the 1860s and is in Queen Street. Several local oyster merchants and shopkeepers were early members of the New Church, but the most unusual among them was the former naval lieutenant George Beazeley, an illegitimate son of the Russian ambassador—Beazeley. He lived with his first wife, the daughter of the church's joint founder, Dr. Moses Fletcher, in Anchor Cottage also in Queen Street.

Maritime
The Mignonette and Cannibalism
In 1867 the yacht Mignonette was built by Aldous Successors in Brightlingsea. The Mignonette foundered on its way to Australia in 1884. In desperation, three of the four shipwrecked crew killed and ate the sickest member, the seventeen-year-old cabin boy named Richard Parker. The subsequent trial, R. v. Dudley and Stephens, established the common law principle that necessity is not a valid defence against a charge of murder.

Fishing
By the 1790s Brightlingsea was a busy fishing port, with oyster beds along the Creek and many smacks, each of about 20-30 tons. By the mid-19th century it had more advertised oyster merchants than anywhere else in England. Their boats went as far as Northern Holland and the Channel Islands. Many Brightlingsea fishermen were drowned, especially on the Dutch coast, their names are recorded in the frieze of tiles inside All Saints' Church. 100 fishing vessels were registered at Brightlingsea in 1914, and 54 in 1939. A combination of wars, changing dietary tastes, shellfish health scares, and easier employment caused the local industry to go into sharp decline. No more oysters were bred after 1963, and by the 1980s there were only 4 fishing boats based in the Creek. 
  

The Age of the Big Yachts
Between 1860 and 1939 Brightlingsea was the winter laying-up and repair station for many large steam yachts owned by the wealthy, and many local men served in their crews, such as Captains Wringe, French, and Sycamore. The wealthy owners dealt with Aldous's Shipyard, which was also the largest builder of fishing smacks on the East Coast and did important work for all 3 armed forces in both world wars. The wealthy patrons included Lipton of the Americas Cup, authors W W Jacobs and Arnold Bennett, the musician Sullivan's heir and nephew Arthur, and most famously the eccentric, reclusive but generous American millionaire Bayard Brown, whose yacht Valfreya lay in the Colne for almost 30 years. 
(J Leather: The Northseamen: Brightlingsea Museum Collection: census data: Essex County Standard)

The two world wars
The Great War (1914-1918)
During the Great War, the Royal Navy maintained a naval base in the town, Brightlingsea Station, from where it installed, guarded, and maintained the booms and nets protecting the Swin Anchorage. The anchorage was periodically used by a squadron of battleships, including HMS Dreadnought, and served as the launchpad for the raid on Zeebrugge and Ostend in 1918. The station also provided an army engineer training facility from 1916 to 1919 when it hosted the training of all ANZAC field engineers sent to the Western Front.

The Second World War (1939-1945)
Brightlingsea Station naval base played a significant role in the early sea war of the Second World War when it was the home port for a small group of experimental magnetic minesweepers and a mine recovery party. Following the Dunkirk evacuation, the station was commissioned as flagship HMS Nemo and its functions were expanded to include coastal patrolling duties, air-sea rescue, and a Combined Operations boat base, which for a time hosted Commando units.

From 1941, local shipyards equipped and repaired motor torpedo boats, motor gunboats, and motor launches for the Royal Navy's Coastal Forces. Between 1942 and 1944 areas of Brightlingsea Creek and Point Clear formed a large landing craft training area. Local shipyards concurrently built small craft for the Royal Navy and RAF, and thousands of pontoons for the British Army.

On 9 January 1941 at 23:00 a single German bomber dropped a single large bomb that missed Aldous Successors' shipyards by some 50 meters only to destroy four terraced houses and damage eight more in Tower Street. No one was killed but two people were seriously injured with a further twelve suffering slight injuries. A party from HMS Nemo, led by Lt. Ashton, helped rescue victims from the rubble. An elderly lady later died due to "bomb shock" after being removed from the rubble. A subsequent air raid in 1941 killed two men working on the vessel Jeannie Leask in the Aldous yard. After the war, numbers 87-105 Tower Street were rebuilt. 

Local war heroes included the Merchant Navy officer Leslie Frost and the fighter pilot Roy Whitehead, who both lost their lives.

The Battles of Brightlingsea

In 1984 Brightlingsea Wharf was used to import coal during the Miners' Strike, and up to a dozen ships could be seen out in the river waiting to unload at Wivenhoe. Kent miners came to picket and some were detained by Essex Police.

Brightlingsea port came to national prominence again in the 1990s with an attempt to use the port again for a controversial cargo. Dubbed the "Battle of Brightlingsea" it comprised a series of protests against the live export of animals from the town for slaughter in mainland Europe. Many people believed that the conditions in which the animals were exported were cruel and inhumane. The protest began on 16 January 1995 and ended on 25 October 1995. During this nine-month period, over 150 convoys passed through the town and 250,000 animals were exported; of these, 24 died, 28 were destroyed by the M.A.F.F., and 38 could not be exported. 598 people were arrested by the police, of whom 421 were local residents. The campaigners' claimed victory as live exports ceased, although a looming ban on the export of British beef connected to the outbreak of Mad Cow disease (BSE) in Great Britain and the related drop in demand for British beef products is a more likely cause of the cessation.

Landmarks

All Saints' Church

The ancient parish church of Brightlingsea stands on a hill at the northern edge of the town. The earliest surviving parts of the building, the chancel, the north and south chapels, and the eastern end of the nave and aisles, date from the 13th century. Further additions were made in the 15th century including the four-storey tower, which was completed around 1490. The church contains a number of monuments dating from the 13th to the 19th centuries. Most notable is a band of 211 square memorial tiles dating from 1872 to 1973; each tile records a Brightlingsea person who has died at sea. A marine chart dated 1590 gives Brightlingsea Church as a navigation mark. It is a Grade I listed building.

Bateman's Tower

Bateman's tower was built in 1883 by John Bateman which he used as a folly for his daughter to recuperate from consumption; however it may have been intended as a lighthouse as part of a failed plan to expand the port. The tower is sited on Westmarsh point at the entrance to Brightlingsea Creek on the River Colne, and is often mistaken for a Martello Tower. During The Second World War the original roof of the folly was removed so that the tower could be used as an observation post by the Royal Observer Corps. In 2005, a restoration project funded by The Heritage Lottery Fund took place to restore the tower to its original condition, including the fitting of a replica of the original roof, refurbishing the interior of the tower and also painting the outside. The tower is now used by the Colne Yacht Club to administer races. Bateman's Tower is leaning slightly; it is said that its foundations were laid on bundles of faggots. It is a Grade II listed building.

Brightlingsea Open Air Swimming Pool
Brightlingsea open-air swimming pool was built in 1933 and is one of the few remaining lidos (open-air swimming pools built mainly in the art-deco period) still in use in the UK. Brightlingsea Lido was originally a single saltwater pool but was converted into two, a 50m swimmers pool and a shallower baby pool c1970's. It is a non-heated freshwater facility.

Transport

The Wivenhoe and Brightlingsea railway opened in 1866 and was a branch line that operated rail services from the nearby town of Wivenhoe into the town centre of Brightlingsea.

The service, unfortunately, fell victim to the Beeching cuts in the 1960s and was eventually axed in 1964 supposedly prompted by the high maintenance costs of the swing bridge over Alresford Creek, which was necessary to allow boat traffic to the many sand and gravel pits in the area. Subsequently, the swing bridge was removed and today (December 2020) only the stone supports survive.

Brightlingsea railway station was located on the southern side of Lower Park Road where the town's community centre now sits. It stayed in place for four years after the railway's closure until it was destroyed by fire in 1968.

Being almost totally surrounded by the Colne Estuary, Brightlingsea Creek & salt marsh, Brightlingsea's road links are unusually limited for a town of its size, with only one road linking the town with the outside. During the North Sea Flood of 1953 Brightlingsea was cut off from the outside, though the town itself was not as severely affected as some neighbouring communities.

Brightlingsea to Alresford
In 2007, one of twenty reserve schemes of Sustrans's Connect2 scheme was a new swing bridge over Alresford Creek. This could give an alternative crossing over the waters around Brightlingsea but by December 2020 no further plans or funding were apparent, whilst Alresford Creek is mooring for fifty pleasure yachts.

Education
Brightlingsea is home to the Colne Community School, a secondary school which serves an extended catchment area which includes Wivenhoe, Alresford, Great Bentley, Thorrington as well as Brightlingsea itself. Ex-principal Terry Creissen, who now resides in Qatar with his family, was honoured (whilst still in the position of headmaster at the Colne) with an OBE. The next Principal of the Colne Community School, Nardeep Sharma, was also awarded an OBE in 2016.

Sports
Brightlingsea Sailing Club runs a competitive sailing programme and has produced many champions at international and Olympic level. Colne Yacht Club is one of the oldest established clubs on the East Coast, with its origins stretching back to the 1870s.

Brightlingsea Regent Football Club plays its matches at North Road in the Isthmian League.

Brightlingsea Cricket Club. Cricket club playing in the Two Counties Cricket League and the  North Essex Cricket League, with a thriving junior kwik cricket and colts section. All home games played at Bayard Recreation Ground

Notable residents
 Reginald White and John Osborn, 1976 Olympic gold medallists in the Tornado catamaran sailing class, both awarded MBEs in 1997

References

External links

 Town council website

 
Towns in Essex
Populated coastal places in Essex
Civil parishes in Essex
Tendring
Beaches of Essex
Ports and harbours of Essex